Adramé Ndiaye (15 January 1958 – 24 December 2020) was a Senegalese basketball player. He competed in the men's tournament at the 1980 Summer Olympics.

References

External links
 

1958 births
2020 deaths
Senegalese men's basketball players
Olympic basketball players of Senegal
Basketball players at the 1980 Summer Olympics